is a software company located in Japan. They originally developed video games for several platforms from the arcades and NES, to the Nintendo 64 and Neo Geo in the past. When Visco was one of the companies under the Taito umbrella, some of its titles back then were labeled "Taito". They also teamed up with Seta and Sammy in developing arcade games powered by the SSV (Sammy, Seta and Visco) arcade system board until Sammy fully acquired noted game company Sega under a new company titled Sega Sammy Holdings in 2004, while Seta's parent company Aruze announced in December 2008 that Seta decided to close their doors after 23 years of existence. Therefore, the SSV board was no longer being produced. From 2008, Visco began manufacturing slot machines for casinos mostly in southeast Asian regions.

Games released

References

External links
 Visco Corporation's Official website 

Video game companies established in 1982
Video game companies of Japan
Japanese companies established in 1982
Computer hardware companies
Video game development companies